Sanne Bjerg (born 11 February 1965) is a Danish opera librettist, director and novelist. She graduated from Forfatterskolen,  the Danish writing school, in 1989. Bjerg was the director of PLEX Music Theatre (formerly Den Anden Opera).

Her opera librettos include  Den sidste virtuos (1991), composed by Lars Klit, Løgn og latin (1998), composed by Svend Aaquist and I-K-O-N (2003), composed by John Frandsen.

Publications 
 Papaya-passionen, 1987 (novel)
"Fejltagelsernes Bog", 2017, (novel)

References

External links

1965 births
Living people
Danish women musicians
Danish women novelists
Danish opera directors
Women librettists